The Maxwell F. Mayer House is a historic house at 2016 Battery Street in Little Rock, Arkansas.  Built 1922–25, it is a two-story Tudor Revival structure, designed by Little Rock architect Maximilian F. Mayer.  The styling is unusual for its neighborhood, which consists mainly of Craftsman and Colonial Revival houses.  It has a side-gable roof with a large projecting gable at the right end, whose right roofline descends to the first floor to shelter a porte-cochere.

The house was listed on the National Register of Historic Places in 1994.

See also
National Register of Historic Places listings in Little Rock, Arkansas

References

Houses on the National Register of Historic Places in Arkansas
Tudor Revival architecture in the United States
Houses in Little Rock, Arkansas
National Register of Historic Places in Little Rock, Arkansas
Historic district contributing properties in Arkansas